The Château du Grand Chavanon, also known as the Château de Saint-Hubert, is a historic château in Neuvy-sur-Barangeon, Cher, France.

History
The chateau was built for the Marquess of Borzas from 1893 to 1897. It was designed by architect Albert-Félix-Théophile Thomas. It was acquired by the Archbishop of Bourges in 1935, and renovated by architect-monk Paul Bellot from 1935 to 1937.

The chateau was acquired by Centrafrican Emperor Jean-Bedel Bokassa in the 1970s. From 1986 to 1995, Bokassa rented it to the Cercle national des combattants, a veteran non-profit organization run by far-right politician Roger Holeindre. The Cercle acquired it from Bokassa in 1995. The chateau hosted the Cadets de France et d'Europe, a summer programme for conservative Catholic youth, until 1999. By the early 2000s, it hosted summer events for the youth wing of the National Front.

Architectural significance
It has been listed as an official historical monument by the French Ministry of Culture since 31 July 2008.

References

Châteaux in Cher
Houses completed in 1897
Monuments historiques of Centre-Val de Loire